Cristal ("crystal") is a Brazilian municipality in the southeastern part of the state of Rio Grande do Sul. The population is 8,067 (2020 est.) in an area of 681.63 km². The Camaquã River flows through the municipality.

Bounding municipalities

Camaquã, north and east
São Lourenço do Sul, south

See also
List of municipalities in Rio Grande do Sul

References

External links
 Official website of the prefecture
https://web.archive.org/web/20071117010701/http://www.citybrazil.com.br/rs/cristal/ 

Municipalities in Rio Grande do Sul
Pelotas (micro-region)